Lectionary 1623, designated by ℓ 1623 in the Gregory-Aland numbering, is a Greek minuscule manuscript of the New Testament, written on 312 parchment leaves (34.5 cm by 23.8 cm). Paleographically it has been assigned to the 11th or 12th century.

Description 

The codex contains Lessons from the Gospels. It is a lectionary (Evangelistarium). Written in two columns per page, 23-28 lines per page.

History 

Currently it is housed at the Kenneth Willis Clark Collection of the Duke University (Gk MS 2) at Durham.

See also 

 List of New Testament lectionaries 
 Textual criticism

References

Further reading 
 K. W. Clark, A Descriptive Catalogue of Greek New Testament Manuscripts in America, Chicago, 1937, pp. 87-89.

External links 
 Lectionary 1623 at the Kenneth Willis Clark Collection of Greek Manuscripts 

Greek New Testament lectionaries
Greek-Coptic diglot manuscripts of the New Testament
11th-century biblical manuscripts
Duke University Libraries